Anthene lunulata, the lunulated hairtail and red-spot ciliate blue, is a butterfly in the family Lycaenidae. It is found in Senegal, Gambia, Mali, Burkina Faso, Guinea, Sierra Leone, Liberia, Ivory Coast, Ghana, Togo, Benin, Nigeria, Cameroon, Sudan, the Democratic Republic of the Congo (Uele, Ituri, Equateur, Sankuru, Lualaba and Shaba), Angola, Zambia, Kenya, Zimbabwe, Mozambique and north-eastern Botswana. The habitat consists of savanna and forests.

Adults of both sexes are attracted to flowers, including those of Tridax species.  Adult males mud-puddle. Adults have been recorded on wing from October to May and in August.

The larvae feed on the young shoots and the outer cortex of the young leaves of Combretum, Acacia, Albizia and Berlinia species, as well as Brachystegia boehmii, Brachystegia spiciformis, Entada abyssinica, Isoberlinea angolensis, Julbernardia globiflora and Parkia filicoides. They are associated with ants of the genus Pheidole, as well as Camponotus acvapimensis and Technomyrmes detorquens. The larvae are yellow green with a darker dorsal line which is sometimes reddish with a mottled appearance due to much yellow striation.

References

Butterflies described in 1894
Anthene
Butterflies of Africa